Siphulella is a fungal genus in the Icmadophilaceae family. The genus is monotypic, containing the single lichen species Siphulella coralloidea, found in southwest Tasmania. The genus and species were described as new to science in 1992 by Gintaras Kantvilas, John Elix and Peter James. The genus name is based on the superficial resemblance that S. coralloidea has to some species in the genus Siphula.

References

Fungi of Australia
Lichen genera
Monotypic Lecanoromycetes genera
Pertusariales
Taxa described in 1992
Taxa named by Gintaras Kantvilas
Taxa named by John Alan Elix
Taxa named by Peter Wilfred James